Džejla Ramović (born 29 April 2002) is a Bosnian solo singer. She rose to fame as the winner of the first season of the Serbian talent show Neki Novi Klinci (Some New Youngsters). Later in 2019 she won the thirteenth season of musical competition Zvezde Granda.

Life and career
After successfully applying to appear on the show Neki Novi Klinci (Some New Kids) in Serbia, she soon gained recognition in the media and went on to enjoy great popularity. Her singing has been widely described as melodic and sensitive and led to the judges of the show choosing Džejla as the winner of the show. Džejla Ramović won the 13th season 2018/2019 of the music competition Zvezde Granda.
Her family discovered that she is talented when she was 4 years old. Her older sister Lejla Ramović and Džejla sang on "Šta se pjesmom sanja" in Goražde. When she was 12 she appeared on Zvezde Granda for the first time. The jury recognized her talent but said she was too young and disqualified her. Year later the show "Neki Novi Klinci" was made. 
Džejla began making music as a young girl in 2014. While later being busy with school and other responsibilities, she managed to find time to make cover songs like Adele's Hello and other such, melodic and emotional songs which she loved to perform. She released her first single entitled Ruža (English: Rose), the lyrics of which were written by Bane Opačić with the arrangement by Alek Aleksov, on 18 January 2017.

As of September 2021, Džejla is a student at the EU Business School in Barcelona, Spain. 

Džejla is fluent in English. Her cousin is Bosnian professional footballer Sinan Ramović.

Discography

Singles
Ruža (2017)
Potraži me (2017)
Jedna kao nijedna (2018)
Ruine (2019)
Ginem (2020)
Sparta (2022)

References

External links

2002 births
Living people
People from Goražde
21st-century Bosnia and Herzegovina women singers
Bosnia and Herzegovina rock singers
Bosnia and Herzegovina folk-pop singers
Bosniaks of Bosnia and Herzegovina